MilCAN is a deterministic protocol that can be applied to Controller Area Network (CAN) technology as specified by ISO 11898. MilCAN has been defined by a group of interested companies and government bodies associated with the specification, manufacture and test of military vehicles. 
  
The MilCAN working group was formed in 1999 as a sub-group of the International High Speed Data Bus - Users Group (IHSDB-UG) when a need was recognised to standardise the implementation of CANbus within the military vehicle community. The mission statement of this group was “To develop, for various application classes in all military vehicles, a common interface implementation specification based on CANbus”.

Although initially developed for the military land systems domain, MilCAN may be applied wherever there is a requirement for deterministic data transfer.

Meetings of the MilCAN work group are held about every six months, and are hosted by one of the group members.

External links 
 MilCAN working group

Serial buses